Olga Tanscaia (born 9 January 1975) is a Moldovan former footballer who played as a forward and a midfielder. She has been a member of the Moldova women's national team. She became a referee for futsal and women's football after playing retirement.

International career
Tanscaia capped for Moldova at senior level during two FIFA Women's World Cup qualifications (2003 and 2007).

Honours

Individual
2004 Best Moldovan Female Footballer of the Year

References

1975 births
Living people
Moldovan women's footballers
Women's association football forwards
Women's association football midfielders
Moldova women's international footballers
Futsal referees
Women's association football referees
Women association football referees